3300 or variant, may refer to:

In general
 A.D. 3300, a year in the 4th millennium CE
 3300 BC, a year in the 4th millennium BCE
 3300, a number in the 3000 (number) range

Products
 International 3300, a bus model usually used as a school bus

Electronics
 CDC 3300, a mainframe computer in the CDC 3000 series
 Datapoint 3300, one of the first computer terminals
 Nokia 3300, a cellphone
 Wang 3300, a minicomputer from Wang Laboratories

Motor Engines
 CAMit 3300, an aero engine
 GM 3300 engine, an automotive engine
 Jabiru 3300, an aero engine

Rail
 GWR 3300 Class steam locomotive class

 Keisei 3300 series electric multiple unit train class
 Meitetsu 3300 series electric multiple unit train class
 NS 3300 steam locomotive class
 Queensland Railways 3300 class electric locomotive class

Other uses
 3300 McGlasson, an asteroid in the Asteroid Belt, the 3300th asteroid registered
 3300 (District of Gramsh), one of the postal codes in Albania

See also

 , a WWI U.S. Navy cargo ship